Bakni (Dargwa: Бакьни) is a rural locality (a selo) in Sutbuksky Selsoviet, Dakhadayevsky District, Republic of Dagestan, Russia. The population was 249 as of 2010. There are 3 streets.

Geography 
Bakni is located 32 km southwest of Urkarakh (the district's administrative centre) by road. Sutbuk and Urtsaki are the nearest rural localities.

Nationalities 
Dargins live there.

References 

Rural localities in Dakhadayevsky District